Madore railway station was on the Ilen Valley Railway in County Cork, Ireland.

History

The station opened on 1 March 1878.

Regular passenger services were withdrawn on 1 April 1961.

Routes

Further reading

References

Disused railway stations in County Cork
Railway stations opened in 1878
Railway stations closed in 1961